The St. Joseph River (Miami-Illinois: Kociihsasiipi) is an  tributary of the Maumee River in northwestern Ohio and northeastern Indiana in the United States, with headwater tributaries rising in southern Michigan. It drains a primarily rural farming region in the watershed of Lake Erie.  

The St. Joseph River of Lake Michigan is an entirely separate river that rises in western Michigan, dips into Indiana, and flows west into Lake Michigan.

Origin
At the end of the Wisconsin glaciation, the glacier's Erie Lobe retreated toward the northeast, leaving large debris deposits called moraines. The St. Joseph formed as a meltwater channel between the north limbs of two of these moraines, the Wabash Moraine on the west and the Fort Wayne Moraine on the east. At that time it joined the St. Marys River to drain into the Wabash River. Later, the shrinkage of Glacial Lake Maumee, the ancestor of modern Lake Erie, brought about the opening of the modern Maumee River, which captured the flow of the St. Joseph and the St. Marys, causing the St. Marys to reverse its course to meet the flow of the St. Joseph almost head-on.

The St. Joseph today
Both branches rise in southern Hillsdale County, Michigan. The headwaters of the East Branch are within  of those of the St. Joseph River of Lake Michigan. Both branches initially flow southeast, then turn to the southwest to flow across the northwestern corner of Ohio past Montpelier. The US Army Corps of Engineers built a flood control project in Fort Wayne that includes a floodwall and upper roadway along the St. Joseph River. (See photo)

Tributaries
From the mouth:
 (left) Becketts Run
 (right) Tiernan Ditch
 (left) Ely Run
 (left) Cedar Creek
 Cedarville Reservoir
 (left) Nettlehorst Ditch
 (left) Warner Ditch
 (right) Wittmer Ditch
 (right) Haifley Ditch
 (left) Swartz-Carnahan Ditch
 Dunton Lake
 (right) Boger Ditch
 (left) Metcalf Ditch
 (right) Walker Ditch
 (left) Dilley Ditch
 (left) Wade Ditch
 (left) Bear Creek
 (right) North Branch Hursey Ditch
 (right) Carper Ditch
 (left) South Branch Hursey Ditch
 (right) Swander Ditch
 (right) Nancy Davis Ditch
 (left) Sol Shank Ditch
 (right) Weicht Ditch
 (left) Sebert Ditch
 (right) Varner Ditch
 (left) Hoodelmier Ditch
 (right) Melissa Ditch
 (left) Buck Creek
 (left) Smith Ditch
 (right) Mason Ditch
 (left) Metcalf Ditch
 (right) Harwood Ditch
 (left) Christoffel Ditch
 (right) Willow Run
 (right) Amaden Ditch
 (right) Greens Ditch
 (right) Foulks Ditch
 (left) Peter Grube Ditch
 (left) Big Run
 (right) Ayford Ditch
 (left) Walters Ditch
 (right) Streeter Ditch
 (right) Praul Ditch
 (right) Mary Metcalf Ditch
 (left) Teutsch Ditch
 (left) Donnell Ditch
 (right) King Ditch
 (right) John Smith Ditch
 (left) Haverstolk Ditch
 (left) Russell Run
 (left) Fish Creek
 (right) Cornell Ditch
 (left) Hiram Sweet Ditch
 (right) Baker Ditch
 (left) Hamilton Lake
 Black Creek
 (left) Haughey Ditch
 (left) Lillian Metz Ditch
 (right) Burch Ditch
 Ball Lake
 (left) Myers Ditch
 Perfect Lake
 (left) West Branch Fish Creek
 (left) Donald Nunkle Ditch
 (left) Bluff Run
 (left) Bear Creek
 (left) Tamarack Ditch
 (left) Eagle Creek
 (right) North Branch Eagle Creek
 (left) Nettle Creek
 Nettle Lake
 (right) Mill Stream Drain
 (right) East Branch St. Joseph River (rises in southwest Adams Township, Hillsdale County, Michigan at )
 (left) Clear Fork
 (left) Silver Creek
 Merry Lake
 (left) Laird Creek
 (right) Nile Ditch
 (left) Ransom Ditch
 (left) Bird Creek
 Bird Lake
 (left) Newton Drain
 (left) Dillon Drain
 (left) Anderson Drain
 (left) Goose Creek
 (left) Lake Number One
 Lake Number Two
 Pittsford Millpond
 (right) Otto Drain
 Deer Lake
 Twin Lake
 (left) West Branch St. Joseph River (rises just south of the intersection of Carpenter Rd. and W. Territorial Rd. in southern Cambria Township, Hillsdale County, Michigan at )
 Lake Seneca
 (left) outflow from Lake La Su An
 (right) East Fork West Branch St. Joseph River (rises in northwest Cambria Township, Hillsdale County, Michigan at )
 (left) Jonas Brown Drain
 (left) Carruthers Drain
 (right) outflow from Cub Lake
 Cambria Millpond
 (left) Cambria Drain
 (left) Meade Drain
 Bear Lake
 (left) Pike Lake
 Broom Lake
 Lake Wilson
 Bankers Lake
 (left) West Fork West Branch St. Joseph River (rises from the outflow of Rebeck Lake in northwest Camden Township, Hillsdale County, Michigan at )
 (left) Joe Drain
 (left) Prouty Drain
 Rebeck Lake
 Mead Lake
 Turner Lake

Drainage basin
The St. Joseph River and tributaries drain all or portions of the following:
 Allen County, Indiana
 Cedar Creek Township
 Cedarville
 Eel River Township
 Fort Wayne
 Grabill
 Milan Township
 Perry Township
 St. Joseph Township
 Springfield Township
 Washington Township
 DeKalb County, Indiana
 Auburn
 Butler Township
 Butler
 Concord Township
 Franklin Township
 Garrett
 Jackson Township
 Keyser Township
 Newville Township
 Richland Township
 Grant Township
 Fairfield Township
 Saint Joe
 Smithfield Township
 Spencer Township
 Spencerville
 Stafford Township
 Troy Township
 Union Township
 Waterloo
 Wilmington Township
 Noble County, Indiana
 Avilla
 Allen Township
 Green Township
 LaOtto
 Swan Township
 Wayne Township
 Steuben County, Indiana
 Clear Lake Township
 Hamilton
 Otsego Township
 Richland Township
 York Township
 Defiance County, Ohio
 Milford Township

 Williams County, Ohio
 Bridgewater Township
 Blakeslee
 Center Township
 Edgerton
 Edon
 Florence Township
 Madison Township
 Montpelier
 Northwest Township
 Pioneer
 St. Joseph Township
 Superior Township
 Hillsdale County, Michigan
 Adams Township
 Amboy Township
 Cambria Township
 Camden Township
 Camden
 Jefferson Township
 Osseo
 Pittsford Township
 Ransom Township
 Reading Township
 Wheatland Township
 Woodbridge Township
 Wright Township

See also
List of Indiana rivers
List of Michigan rivers
List of rivers of Ohio
USS St. Joseph's River, a World War II-era US Navy vessel named after this river.

References

Further reading
Water Resource Availability in the Maumee River Basin, Indiana, Water Resource Assessment 96-5, Indianapolis:Indiana Department of Natural Resources, Division of Water, 1996, p. 46.
Sunderman, Jack A., "The Three Faces of Cedar Creek,"  ACRES Quarterly, v. 39, no. 4 (Fall 2000), pp. 6-7.

External links

 EPA St. Joseph Watershed Profile
 St. Joseph River Watershed Initiative
 Maumee River Basin Commission
 Maume Valley Heritage Corridor

Rivers of Indiana
Rivers of Michigan
Rivers of Ohio
Rivers of Allen County, Indiana
Rivers of Hillsdale County, Michigan
Rivers of DeKalb County, Indiana
Rivers of Williams County, Ohio
Tributaries of Lake Erie